Cardiff Metropolitan University Football Club, commonly known as Cardiff Met F.C., are a Welsh football club, of the Athletic Union of Cardiff Metropolitan University, based in Cyncoed, Cardiff that plays in the Cymru Premier. The club badge features the bowman with the words 'I lwyddo, rhaid chwarae' which is translated as 'To succeed, [one] must play'.

History

The team has gone through a series of name changes, mirroring the name changes of the institution it represented. The team was originally known as Cardiff College of Education F.C.. They became South Glamorgan Institute F.C. in 1979; Cardiff Institute of Higher Education F.C. in 1990 and UWIC in 1996. In 2000, Inter Cardiff F.C. merged with Cardiff Metropolitan University (UWIC) to form UWIC Inter Cardiff F.C reverting to simply UWIC in 2009. They changed their name again in the summer of 2012 to Cardiff Metropolitan University F.C.

Cardiff College made their Welsh Cup debut in 1964, defeating Pembroke Borough 3–2 in their inaugural game and Dunlop Semtex 3–0 in the third round before suffering elimination in round 4 at the hands of Merthyr Tydfil.

Between 1966 and 1967 and 1969–70 Cardiff College of Education reached the final of the Welsh Amateur cup every year, winning the cup on 2 occasions in 1968 and 1969 beating Welshpool and Tonyrefail Welfare respectively.

Whilst the club had enjoyed Amateur Cup success and were now regulars in the Welsh Cup, it was not until the 1972–73 season that the Archers took their place in the Welsh league, finishing a creditable 7th in their first season. The following season the club ended the campaign in 10th place and again reached the final of the Welsh Amateur Cup, losing 2–1 to Whitchurch Alport. The 1974–75 season saw the club promoted to the second tier of Welsh football for the first time following a second-place finish behind eventual champions Blaenavon Blues, despite ending the season level on points.

The 1975–76 season saw the club complete a league and FAW Intermediate Cup double, scoring over 100 goals in the process. The promotion meant the club would be playing at the top level of Welsh Football for the first time in its history. However, after just two seasons in the Welsh League South Premier Division, the 1978–79 season saw the team record just one win and its lowest ever points tally to finish bottom of the league.

The following 7 seasons were unremarkable, as the club recorded consistent mid-table finishes until the 1986–87 season when the club once again suffered the ignominy of relegation back to the third tier of Welsh football for the first time since 1974. Once again the club struggled and were demoted to the Welsh League Division 3 following the inception of the League of Wales in 1992.

It was not until the 1995–96 season that the club were promoted back to level 3 of the Welsh Pyramid, scoring 104 goal in just 28 league games and without losing a game all season. Back-to-back promotions were confirmed the following season as the Archers secured a second-place finish, six points behind champions Bridgend Town.

After 3 seasons in Welsh League Division 1, it was announced that the club would be merging with Inter Cardiff to form a new club, UWIC Inter Cardiff playing in the League of Wales for the 2000–01 season. With only 3 wins and 13 points, the club were relegated after just one season and returned to Welsh League Division 1 where they remained until the 2006–07 campaign which saw the Archers demoted to Division 2.

2009 represented a landmark moment in the history of the club with the appointment of former professional footballer and Welsh international, Christian Edwards as Director of football. Edwards was ably assisted by Professor Robyn Jones, who was part of the Sutton United team that dumped Coventry City out of the FA Cup in 1989. Initially things did not start well for the club, who dropped back into Welsh League division 3 due to a Cymru Premier restructure and the domino effect on the divisions below.  Whilst the 2010–11 season ended with a disappointing mid table finish, the club equalled their best Welsh Cup showing by reaching the quarter-finals only to lose 4–0 at the hands of GAP Connah's Quay.

The 2012–13 and 2013–14 seasons saw the club collect back-to-back championships and start the 2014–15 campaign in Welsh League Division 1. Looking for an unprecedented third successive promotion and a chance to play at the top level of Welsh football, the students came agonisingly close to realising that dream only to lose out cruelly on goal difference to Haverfordwest County, following the West Walians 5–0 defeat of Aberdare Town.

The 2015–16 season began with the Archers as favourites to get promoted and despite being pushed all the way by both Barry and Goytre, promotion was sealed in late April with a 3–0 victory at Taff's Well to ensure Capital City representation in the Cymru Premier for the first time since the 2005–06 season.

The 2016–17 campaign started badly for the students, picking up just one point from their first 6 matches with a goalless draw away to Cefn Druids. Whilst many doubted whether the students could stay in the division, a run of 3 consecutive victories within a week restored confidence and proved the catalyst to not only ensuring survival but qualifying for the end of season Europa League Play-offs with a 6th-place finish. Met faced Carmarthen Town and despite going a goal down early in the second half, a sumptuous lob from Adam Roscrow and an injury time diving header from Charlie Corsby was enough to see the club through to face Bangor City in the final. Sadly for Met, the dream was shattered when Dean Rittenburg drilled home from 12 yards for the Citizens to give Bangor a 1–0 victory and a passport into the Europa League Qualifying round.

On 19 May 2019, Cardiff Met defeated Bala Town F.C. in a penalty shoot-out to qualify for the preliminary round of the 2019–20 UEFA Europa League.  The club will play their home matches in the competition at Cardiff International Sports Stadium.

League and cup history

Honours

League
Welsh Football League Division One
Champions: 1975–76, 2015–16
Welsh Football League Division Two
Champions: 2013–14
Runner-up: 1974–75, 1996–97
Welsh Football League Division Three
Champions: 1995–96, 2012–13

Cups
Welsh Amateur Cup
Champions: 1968, 1969, 1976
Runner-up: 1967, 1970, 1974
Welsh League Cup
Champions: 2019
Runners-up: 2018, 2022

European record
All results (home and away) list Cardiff's goal tally first.

As of 4 July 2019

Notes
 PR: Preliminary round
 1QR: First qualifying round
 QR: Qualifying round

Current squad

References

External links

Football clubs in Cardiff
Football clubs in Wales
Cardiff Metropolitan University
University and college football clubs in Wales
Association football clubs established in 2000
2000 establishments in Wales
Cymru Premier clubs
Welsh Football League clubs